Arvind Rajaraman is an Indian-born theoretical physicist and string theorist.  Rajaraman earned his Ph.D. from Stanford University.  He is an associate professor at University of California, Irvine.

The first time that India received any medals in International Mathematics Olympiad (IMO) was in 1989, when four among six Indian participants received a bronze medal. Rajaraman was one of these four bronze medal winning participants. Rajaraman was also part of the UC Irvine team whose research contributed to the 2003 Nobel Prize in Physics.

References

External links 
List of works by Rajaraman

Indian theoretical physicists
Indian emigrants to the United States
Stanford University alumni
University of California, Irvine faculty
American Hindus
Living people
International Mathematical Olympiad participants
Year of birth missing (living people)